Artur Dariusz Orzech (born 22 February 1964, in Jelenia Góra) is a Polish journalist, radio and television presenter and music broadcaster.

After graduating from IV Liceum Ogólnokształcące im. Adama Mickiewicza w Warszawie in 1983 with an English degree he co-founded the music group Róże Europy. '

He joined Telewizja Polska as an Continuity Announcer. He has since hosted programmes such as Muzyczna Jedynka, Prywatna kolekcja, Orzech i reszta and Szansa na Sukces. From 1992 until his dismissal in 2021 he commentated on the Eurovision Song Contest for Polish viewers as well as hosted the national finals for the Contest.

In March 2021, he was dismissed from his job at Telewizja Polska. The decision was caused by the fact that, according to TVP management, he informed too late about his absence from the recording of Szansa na Sukces program due to an "indisposition", which resulted a delay of releasing an episode, and, according to broadcaster's communication release, exposed TVP "to financial and image losses". Later Orzech explained this by his opposition to a dominant music line of the public broadcaster and his disagreement to host episodes with the participation of, among others, the discopoly band Boys or Jan Pietrzak. 

It was also announced Marek Sierocki would be the new host of the program. Later it was announced that Sierocki and Aleksander Sikora would replace Orzech as Eurovision Song Contest commentators.

Since 2001, he has also been a host on the national radio station Radio dla Ciebie.

References

External links
 

1964 births
Living people
People from Jelenia Góra
Polish journalists
Polish television presenters
Polish radio presenters
Radio and television announcers
Poland in the Eurovision Song Contest